PF-03654746 is a potent and selective histamine H3 receptor antagonist developed by Pfizer and currently undergoing clinical trials for the treatment of ADHD, Tourette syndrome as well as potential anti-allergy applications.

References 

Carboxamides
H3 receptor antagonists
Nootropics
Organofluorides
Pfizer brands
Pyrrolidines
Fluoroarenes
Cyclobutanes